is located at Lake Chūzenji (source of the Oshiri River) in Nikkō National Park near the city of Nikkō, Tochigi Prefecture,  Japan. The falls were formed when the Daiya River was rerouted by lava flows.

In the autumn, the traffic on the road from Nikko to Chūzenji can sometimes slow to a crawl as visitors come to see the fall colors.

In 1927, the Kegon Falls was recognized as one of the "Eight Views" which best showed Japan and its culture in the Shōwa period. It is also listed as one of the "Japan’s Top 100 Waterfalls", in a listing published by the Japanese Ministry of the Environment in 1990.

The Kegon Falls are infamous for suicides, especially among Japanese youth.

Suicides 

Misao Fujimura (1886 – May 22, 1903), a Japanese philosophy student and poet, is largely remembered due to his farewell poem written directly on the trunk of a tree before committing suicide by jumping from the Kegon Falls.

The story was soon sensationalized in contemporary newspapers and was commented upon by the famed writer Natsume Sōseki. This led the famed scenic falls to become a notorious spot for lovetorn or otherwise desperate youngsters to take their lives (Werther Effect).

References 

土門公記（Domon Kouki）: 藤村操の手紙－華厳の滝に眠る16歳のメッセージ. Shimotsuke Shimbunsha, 2002,

External links

A trip to Kegon Falls with fall colours
Tourism website for Kegon Falls 
Why 200 people committed suicide near the Kegon Falls? An article about the history of the Falls and its dark side of suicides. 

Waterfalls of Japan
Nikkō, Tochigi
Tourist attractions in Tochigi Prefecture
Landforms of Tochigi Prefecture